Ben M. Hall (1921-1970) was an American author and theater historian. His 1961 book, The Best Remaining Seats, was a seminal work in the history of theaters. It was the first to survey the origins and architecture of America's movie palaces, the palatial cinemas built between the 1910s and the 1940s to showcase the films of Hollywood's major studios.

In 1969, Hall founded the Theatre Historical Society of America.

Born and raised in Atlanta, Georgia, Ben Hall resided in Manhattan, near the Hudson River, at 181 Christopher Street in Greenwich Village. He lived in the upper two floors of a former steamship company. He was murdered there in December, 1970, just short of his 49th birthday.

The following is excerpted from his obituary in the Atlanta Constitution of December 18, 1970:

Hall's funeral was planned to be held "Saturday, Dec. 19, 1970 at 2 o'clock at All Saints Episcopal Church in Atlanta."   "As pallbearers, Mr. Robert T. Eskew, Mr. Alex M. Hitz Jr., Mr. Joseph Patton , Mr. Charles E. Freeman, Jr., Dr. Marvous Mosteller, and Mr. George C. Woelper."

References

External links
 Theatre Historical Society of America

1921 births
1970 deaths
20th-century American non-fiction writers
UNC Hussman School of Journalism and Media alumni